Mladen Ivanić (born 16 September 1958) is a Bosnian Serb politician who served as the 6th Serb Member of the Presidency of Bosnia and Herzegovina from 17 November 2014 until 20 November 2018. He is the founder, member and former president of the Party of Democratic Progress.

Ivanić also served as Minister of Foreign Affairs from 23 December 2002 until 11 January 2007. He was the 7th Prime Minister of Republika Srpska as well.

Early life and education
Born in Sanski Most, Ivanić has lived in Banja Luka since 1971, earning his university diploma in economics there. He then received a doctorate in Belgrade; the thesis was titled Contemporary Marxist political economy in the West. He undertook post-Doctoral studies at the University of Mannheim and the University of Glasgow. Upon completion of his studies, he worked as a journalist. From 1985 to 1988, he lectured in Political economy at the Faculty of Economics in Banja Luka, and later also in Sarajevo and Glasgow.

Early political career
Ivanić's political career began in 1988, when he became a member of the Presidency of SR Bosnia and Herzegovina during Yugoslav Socialist times.

From 2001 until 2003, he was Prime Minister of Republika Srpska, one of Bosnia and Herzegovina's two entities. He also served as Minister of Foreign Affairs, succeeding Zlatko Lagumdžija on the post, and as such was a member of the Council of Ministers of Bosnia and Herzegovina (i.e. the national government). In turn, he was succeeded on the post in 2007 by Sven Alkalaj. Ivanić is a founding member of the center-right Bosnian Serb Party of Democratic Progress (PDP) and was its President from 1999 to 2015.

Presidency (2014–2018)

At the 2014 general election, held on 12 October, Ivanić was elected as the Serb member of the Presidency of Bosnia and Herzegovina, narrowly beating Alliance of Independent Social Democrats' (SNSD) candidate, the Republika Srpska Prime Minister Željka Cvijanović. His victory marked the first time since the Dayton Agreement that a Serb member of the Presidency received the highest number of votes in the country, out of the three elected members. He was then Chairman of the Presidency (head of state) from 17 November 2014 until 17 July 2015 and again from 17 November 2016 until 17 July 2017.

On 7 June 2015, Ivanić met with Pope Francis in Sarajevo, as part of the Popes's 2015 papal visit to Bosnia and Herzegovina.

In March 2017, he visited Jerusalem and met with Israeli Prime Minister Benjamin Netanyahu. While in Jerusalem, Ivanić talked about the Jewish community in Bosnia and Herzegovina, saying that "the community should not expect property expropriated during the Holocaust in Bosnia to be given back or to be compensated for its seizure. A restitution law had at one time been created in Bosnia, but fell by the wayside because the process would be too complicated. The seized properties were taken over by the Yugoslav Communists after the war, then privatised, while some of them have been demolished or replaced." Ivanić further insisted that he would restore the property or give compensation if he could, but that the matter was not in his hands.

At the 2018 general election, held on 7 October, Ivanić lost his bid for re-election to the Bosnian Presidency to SNSD's leader and Republika Srpska President Milorad Dodik.

Attitudes towards the European Union and the Republika Srpska referendum

Ivanić advocated Bosnia and Herzegovina's accession to the European Union. In an interview with web portal European Western Balkans in January 2016, he stated that "by joining the EU, Bosnia and Herzegovina would receive rules that were developed by a third party, and thus internal differences would become less important. It is also a good economic space." Ivanić mentioned the slowness of the Bosnian authorities in making decisions as possible difficulties that the country could face, and pointed out that this is why reform in Bosnia and Herzegovina is needed.

Regarding the Republika Srpska National Day referendum announced by Milorad Dodik regarding the legislation of Bosnia and Herzegovina, Ivanić stated:

Personal life
Mladen is married to Gordana Ivanić, and together they have two children. They live in Banja Luka.

He is fluent in English.

References

External links

Mladen Ivanić at imovinapoliticara.cin.ba

1958 births
Living people
People from Sanski Most
Serbs of Bosnia and Herzegovina
University of Banja Luka alumni
Party of Democratic Progress politicians
Prime ministers of Republika Srpska
Government ministers of Bosnia and Herzegovina
Foreign ministers of Bosnia and Herzegovina
Members of the House of Peoples of Bosnia and Herzegovina
Chairmen of the House of Peoples of Bosnia and Herzegovina
Members of the Presidency of Bosnia and Herzegovina
Chairmen of the Presidency of Bosnia and Herzegovina